phuuz entertainment is a company based in Universal City, California that develops content for various forms of media, including television, theaters, the internet, mobile devices, and video games. The president of the company is former Warner Bros. Animation executive Ken Duer. Other company heads include animation artist and producer Eric Radomski, and former Film Roman and LEVEL13.net manager Jay Francis.

The company has undergone a few name changes and re-incorporations. It originally started as Fuse Entertainment, Inc., then later changed its name to phuuz entertainment inc. phuuz has worked with Warner Bros. Animation, Warner Bros. Home Video, TV Asahi, Toei Animation, Banpresto, Seoul Movie, TMS Entertainment, MTV, Film Roman, C2 Pictures, Geneon Entertainment USA, Mutant Enemy Productions, 20th Century Fox Television, Paramount Home Entertainment, Kids' WB, and Cartoon Network.

Work

ADR Production
Crayon Shin-chan - Second English dub, only aired in Europe and Latin America
Doraemon - 1979 series, pitch pilot only
Lupin the 3rd - 1978 series, first 104 episodes
Lupin the 3rd: The Secret of Mamo
Lupin the 3rd: Treasure of the Sorcerer King
Bobobo-bo Bo-bobo
Viewtiful Joe

ADR consulting
Noein - To Your Other Self - For Media Concepts

Distribution consulting
Minimax
TMS - For North American and European markets.

Logo creation
Bandai Entertainment

Production consulting
Sprite Entertainment
Zoom Kitty

Supervising production
Xiaolin Showdown - by Eric Radomski
Toei Animation - Promotions.
Toy Warrior

Sales representative
Elysium

Notes

Mass media companies established in 2002
Entertainment companies established in 2002
2002 establishments in California
Companies based in Greater Los Angeles
Anime companies
Mass media companies of the United States
Video production companies